The South American jaguar is a jaguar (Panthera onca) population in South America. Though a number of subspecies of jaguar have been proposed for South America, morphological and genetic research did not reveal any evidence for subspecific differentiation.

Taxonomic history
Initially, a number of subspecies were described for South America:
 Panthera onca onca was proposed by Reginald Innes Pocock in 1939.
 Pocock also mentioned other subspecies, such as Panthera onca peruviana (de Blainville, 1843), but eventually, due to a lack of evidence, he accepted that Panthera onca peruviana could be the same subspecies as Panthera onca onca. In other words, the taxonomic name Panthera onca onca referred to a geographic group, if not subspecies, of jaguars north and west of the Amazon River, and south of Central America, including some Colombian jaguars, which was believed to include another group of jaguars, that is Panthera onca centralis.
 The Pantanal jaguar was proposed as the largest subspecies, with the taxonomic name Panthera onca palustris (Ameghino, 1888), native to the Pantanal region of South America, besides Argentina.
 A specimen from Bolivia was given the name Panthera onca boliviensis (Nelson and Goldman, 1933), before it was considered as being of Panthera onca palustris by Carbera (1957).
 Panthera onca paraguensis (Hollister, 1914) was described for a jaguar from the Gran Chaco or the Pantanal regions in Paraguay.

Morphological research has failed to find evidence for subspecific differentiation.

Characteristics 

Jaguars are considered to be larger than cougars, and those in South America tend to be heavier than those in Central or North America. Within South America, there are differences for jaguars which are north and south of the Amazon River.

In Guyana, specimens weighing up to  have been reported. Jaguars from the Llanos in Venezuela, and the Pantanal region of southern Brazil, Bolivia and Paraguay, are the largest of the species.

Habitat and distribution 

In Peru, the jaguar is found in the Pacaya-Samiria National Reserve, and Manú National Park. Jaguars disappeared in a number of places, like the Pampas' part of Argentina and Uruguay.

Behavior and ecology 
In South America, the jaguar's prey includes the peccary, and capybara. Sympatric predators include the puma and spectacled bear. Spectacled bears appear to avoid places where the jaguar is present. This suggests predation on the bear by the jaguar.

Attacks on humans 
Occasionally, jaguars may attack humans, depending on factors such as the availability of natural prey:
 In 2015, at Isseneru Village in Cuyuni-Mazaruni, near the Mazaruni River in the Guyana Montane Forest, a jaguar attacked an indigenous girl aged three. She later received medical treatment, and survived.
 A fatal attack on a child belonging to the Taushiro people, who are from the border region of Peru and Ecuador, had been reported. As it were, the child's grandfather had a history of warning his family about such attacks, which he believed were more likely to occur at night, as they slept.
 In 2017, a fisherman checking his nets and a heavy machine operator were killed in separate attacks in Bocas del Atrato near the Panamanian border on Colombia's Caribbean coast.

Threats 

In Bolivia, jaguars are threatened by the illegal trafficking of their parts, including fangs to China. They are also threatened by the removal of habitat, and conflict with humans.

Cultural significance 

The jaguar is featured in the crest of Argentina's national federation in rugby union. Jaguares de Córdoba is a football team in Colombia. The Lost Land of the Jaguar is a nature documentary by the BBC on Guyana's fauna, including the jaguar.

Juma 
During the relaying of the torch at the 2016 Summer Olympics in Brazil, a female, captive jaguar in Manaus called 'Juma' was used as a mascot. However, it tried to escape, and on approaching a person, was killed. The animal's death provoked outrage, similar to that of Harambe, a captive gorilla earlier.

See also 
 North American jaguar
 European jaguar
 Pleistocene North American jaguar
 Pleistocene South American jaguar
 Paseo del Jaguar

References

External links 
 Male jaguars fight hard for territory (YouTube)

Jaguars
Fauna of northern South America
Prehistory of Venezuela
Prehistory of Peru
Prehistory of Ecuador
Prehistory of Colombia
Mammals of Venezuela
Mammals of Peru
Mammals of Brazil
Mammals of Ecuador
Mammals of Bolivia
Mammals of Paraguay
Mammals described in 1758
Taxa named by Carl Linnaeus
Mammals of Guyana
Mammals of Suriname
Mammals of French Guiana